The Woodward School has been educating and empowering young women in grades 6 - 12 since 1894. Located in Quincy, Massachusetts, near Quincy Center, it is the only private high school in the city. On top of its core syllabus, the school offers a wide curriculum which includes AP courses, Latin, French, Spanish, Visual Arts, Rhetoric, Computer Science Music, Theatre, and a robust internship program for high school students to name but a few.

History
The Woodward School was founded by Dr. Ebenezer Woodward, a prominent physician and cousin of John Adams. When Dr. Woodward died in 1869, his will established a trust fund to create and maintain a girls' school equivalent to the boys-only Adams Academy. The town of Quincy (which became a city in 1888) was named trustee of the fund, and was given 25 years to build the school. Management of the school was allocated in perpetuity to the town's selectmen. The school building was designed by E. G. Thayer in the Queen Anne style, with clapboard siding and a slate roof. It was built by Stephen Loxon and completed in 1894, just short of the 25-year deadline. It was added to the National Register of Historic Places as Woodward Institute on November 13, 1989, reference number 89001954.

See also
National Register of Historic Places listings in Quincy, Massachusetts

References

External links

History of the school at the Woodward School homepage
Woodward School's planned expansion
Woodward's Latin program
School's success in Christmas Parade float competition

School buildings on the National Register of Historic Places in Massachusetts
Private high schools in Massachusetts
Private middle schools in Massachusetts
Education in Quincy, Massachusetts
Girls' schools in Massachusetts
Buildings and structures in Quincy, Massachusetts
Queen Anne architecture in Massachusetts
School buildings completed in 1893
Schools in Norfolk County, Massachusetts
National Register of Historic Places in Quincy, Massachusetts